Erick McIntosh (born May 27, 1987) is an American football defensive back for the San Antonio Gunslingers. He played college football at Florida Atlantic University. He has also been a member of the Tampa Bay Storm, Orlando Predators, Iowa Barnstormers and Jacksonville Sharks.

Early years
McIntosh played high school football at Lehigh Senior High School in Lehigh Acres, Florida. He recorded 62 tackles and an interception his senior year.

College career
McIntosh played for the Florida Atlantic Owls from 2005 to 2009. He was redshirted in 2005. He started four games and compiled 53 tackles his senior season.

Professional career

Tampa Bay Storm
McIntosh signed with the Tampa Bay Storm on May 26, 2010 after going undrafted in the 2010 NFL Draft. He recorded 40 tackles and two interceptions his rookie year in 2010. He led the Storm in tackles with 102 and tied for the team-lead with four interceptions in 2011. McIntosh accumulated 72.5 tackles and two interceptions in 2012.

Orlando Predators
McIntosh was signed by the Orlando Predators on November 8, 2012.

Iowa Barnstormers
McIntosh was traded to the Iowa Barnstormers for Gershom Jordan on March 12, 2013. He recorded 51.5 tackles and four interceptions in thirteen games in 2013.

Orlando Predators
McIntosh signed with the Orlando Predators on May 15, 2014. He collected 21.5 tackles in four starts in 2014.

Jacksonville Sharks
McIntosh signed with the Jacksonville Sharks on December 14, 2016.

Albany Empire
On March 24, 2018, McIntosh was assigned to the Albany Empire. On March 28, 2018, he was placed on physically unable to perform.

San Antonio Gunslingers 
McIntosh signed with the San Antonio Gunslingers on November 17, 2021.

References

External links

Just Sports Stats
College stats

Living people
1987 births
Players of American football from Florida
American football defensive backs
African-American players of American football
Florida Atlantic Owls football players
Tampa Bay Storm players
Iowa Barnstormers players
Orlando Predators players
Jacksonville Sharks players
Albany Empire (AFL) players
Sportspeople from Fort Myers, Florida
21st-century African-American sportspeople
20th-century African-American people